Oihana Kortazar Elizondo (born 29 June 1984) is a Spanish female sky runner who won gold medal at the 2011 Skyrunning European Championships in SkyRace and the overall title of the 2011 Skyrunner World Series.

References

External links
 Oihana Kortazar profile at Myskyrunning.com

1984 births
Living people
Spanish sky runners